Captain George Costentenus, also known as "The Arvanite Greek" or "The Tattooed Greek Prince", (April 17, 1833 - ?) was a circus performer in the late 1800s.  A man who was tattooed over his entire body, he was a famous traveling attraction who claimed to have been kidnapped by Chinese Tartars and tattooed against his will. His surname was sometimes spelled as Constantenus and Constantinius. He was also known as Djordgi Konstantinus and Georgius Constantine.

Fictive origins as reported in America
In 1867 he was travelling with an American and a Spaniard in Tartary on a mining expedition. A rebellion arose and they sided with the insurgents. They were taken prisoner and subjected to a three-month-long tattooing session as punishment. After the tattooing was completed, the three escaped from prison. The American survived only a few months. The Spaniard went blind and died in Manila. The tattooing was done with indigo and cinnabar, and covered him from head to foot. The only exceptions were the soles of his feet and parts of his ears. All together he had 387 figures tattooed on his body. Those images ranged from exotic animals to flowers to geometric figures to foreign writing. He was known to be able to speak multiple languages.

Early life
George Costentenus was born on April 17, 1833. He was a native of Albania, in the Ottoman Empire, however his family was ethnically Greek and they were Christians. As an adult, he was a pirate and adventurer. He was able to speak Greek, Arabic, Persian, French, Spanish, Italian, German, and English. In the 1860s, he took part in a French expedition to Burma that was in search of gold. The expedition was proclaimed hostile by the Konbaung dynasty government at Awa. He and eleven companions fell into the hands of the Royal Burmese armed forces troops. Nine of the party were executed. Costentenus and two others were punished by tattooing at Bhamo. During the three-month long process, he had to be held down by four men. He eventually escaped and spent four months travelling through southern China before reaching Amoy. The European consul there helped him reach Manila, where he was sick for some time. He then traveled to British Hong Kong, took a ship through the Suez Canal, and then went to Vienna, Austrian Empire for a lengthy period. In the early 1870s while in Vienna, he attracted the attention of medical professionals and anthropologists. They counted 388 figures. The tattoos on his fingers were translated from Burmese and indicated his was considered to be a poor character. The academics who examined him did notice several variations in the story he told, and somewhat doubted that the process took only three months. They did believe his tattoos to be authentic examples of Burmese tattooing.

Career
After being examined by the academic community, Costentenus began to exhibit himself in western Europe. In October 1874, Costentenus was exhibiting himself in Paris, France.

He came to United States around 1875 due to the coming Centennial Exposition. By 1876, he was under contract with P. T. Barnum and was being paid $100 a day. He toured with P. T. Barnum's New and Greatest Show on Earth in 1876 and 1877. In June 1878, while again on tour with Barnum a fight broke between Costentenus and the giant Colonel Routh Goshen. The fight was said to have originated after Costentenus insulted some ladies within Goshen's presence. Costentenus was injured during the fight. Costentenus toured the United States with Barnum again in 1879 and 1880.

When not exhibiting himself as near to naked as could be allowed, Costentenus dressed heavily and wore expensive jewelry. In early 1882, he was exhibiting himself at the Royal Aquarium with an exhibition arranged by William Leonard Hunt. That same year, he became a resident of New York City.
In December 1883, Costentenus applied for United States citizenship. At the time, he was planning to go to Europe for treatment for his failing eyesight, but wanted to do so as an American citizen. At the time he was blind in one eye and losing his sight in the other. He claimed to have been in the country for seven years. He became an American citizen on December 22, 1883. On February 16, 1884 he sailed for Europe aboard the SS Republic. In 1885 he was said to have gone blind and retired to a wealthy estate in Greece. By June 1889, he was exhibiting himself at the Folies Bergère in Paris, France. In October 1889, he returned to New York.

In 1890, he applied for a passport to travel to Europe and planned to return two years later. He applied for another passport in 1894. After that date he disappears from records.

Footnotes

References
 Carlyn Beccia, Who Put the B in the Ballyhoo? (Houghton Mifflin, 2007. )
 Leonard Cassuto, The Inhuman Race: The Racial Grotesque in American Literature and Culture, p183. (Columbia University Press, 1997.  )
 Michigan State University: Attitudes About Tattooing, Attitudes in the 1800s.
 South Street Seaport Museum.

Year of death missing
1833 births
Sideshow performers
People known for being heavily tattooed
Greek emigrants to the United States
Emigrants from the Ottoman Empire to Austria-Hungary
19th-century circus performers